Columbus Memorial Library is located in the headquarters of the Organization of American States in Washington, D.C.

The library offers extensive collection of books and periodicals that date back to 1535.

References

World Digital Library partners
Libraries in Washington, D.C.
Organization of American States